Dai Francis may refer to:

Dai Francis (trade union leader) (1911–1981)
Dai Francis (singer) (1930–2003)

See also
David Francis (disambiguation)